This is a list of defunct airlines of Peru.

See also
List of airlines of Peru
List of airports in Peru

References

Airlines, defunct
Peru